Antonio Ihaka Kiri Kiri (born 17 December 1991) is a New Zealand rugby union player who currently plays as a flanker for Rugby New York in Major League Rugby

Career 
He left Cornish Pirates on the 22 April 2022 to join Rugby New York.

He started the 2022 Major League Rugby Final which saw Rugby New York win their first MLR championship

References 

New Zealand rugby union players
1991 births
Living people
Rugby union flankers
Rugby union number eights
Rugby union players from Whanganui
Manawatu rugby union players
Blues (Super Rugby) players
Leeds Tykes players
Cornish Pirates players
Rugby New York players